Judy Minx (born around 1989) is a French pornographic actress. She identifies as a sex worker, queer and as a feminist activist.

Biography
Judy Minx was born in Paris and is of Tunisian and Algerian descent. She joined a feminist organization in 2005 when she was in high school. Right after she turned 18, in 2007, she became a porn actress in "mainstream straight porn". She also started getting involved with queer and feminist porn movements. Along with her porn career, she continued her studies, and she holds a degree in English. Judy Minx is an activist for sex worker rights, and she is close to the French sex worker's trade union (STRASS). She has also given sex education workshops.

In 2009, she appeared in the documentary film Les travailleu(r)ses du sexe, directed by Jean-Michel Carré. In 2010, she starred the drama film The Final Girl by Todd Verow, which was defined as "a lesbian variation of Roman Polanski's The Tenant". In 2011, she was one of the protagonists of Too Much Pussy!, a docudrama film directed by Emilie Jouvet that followed the journey through Europe (from Berlin to Malmö) of a group of six entertainers, all members the Sex-positive movement. That same year, she starred in a segment of Fucking Different XXX, a German independent film consisting of eight episodes, each shot by a different director and set in a different city, that have gay/lesbian love as a main theme. In 2011, she appeared in the music video for the Ladytron song "White Elephant". In 2012, she appeared in the independent comedy film Mommy Is Coming, directed by Cheryl Dunye. In 2013 she appeared on the Dutch documentary "Een man weet niet wat hij mist", where she has sex with a gold-star gay man on film in order to help him lose his heterosexual virginity.

Partial filmography
 Een man weet niet wat hij mist (2013)
 Mommy is Coming (2012)
 Fucking Different XXX (2011)
 Much More Pussy (2011)
 Roulette Toronto (2010)
 Too Much Pussy! Feminist Sluts, a Queer X Show (2010)
 The Final Girl (2010)
 Histoires de sexes (2010)
 Les travailleu(r)ses du sexe (2010)
 Pascal le grand frere pineur 1 (2009)
 Roulette Berlin (2009)
 Ti'touch II (2008)

References

External links

Living people
Actresses from Paris
French film actresses
French pornographic film actresses
French feminists
French people of Algerian descent
French people of Tunisian descent
Queer pornographic film actors
Queer feminists
Queer women
Sex-positive feminists
1989 births
LGBT actresses
French LGBT actors